Vastemõisa is a village in Põhja-Sakala Parish, Viljandi County in central Estonia. It has a population of 435 (as of 2009). Until 2005 when Vastemõisa Parish was merged to Suure-Jaani Parish, Vastemõisa was the administrative centre of Vastemõisa Parish. In 2017, Suure-Jaani Parish was merged to Põhja-Sakala Parish.

References

Villages in Viljandi County
Kreis Fellin